Kalinino (Nurăs) is a rural locality (a village) in Vurnarsky District, Chuvash Republic, (Russia).

History 

The diary of Sigismund von Herberstein, written in the 16th century, mentions this village.

References

External links
Official website of Kalinino Rural Settlement 

Vurnarsky District

Rural localities in Chuvashia
Yadrinsky Uyezd